This is a history and list of drinking fountains in the United States. A drinking fountain, also called a water fountain or bubbler, is a fountain designed to provide drinking water. It consists of a basin with either continuously running water or a tap. The drinker bends down to the stream of water and swallows water directly from the stream. Drinking water fountains are most commonly found in heavy usage areas like public amenities, schools, airports, and museums.

History

The first of the drinking fountains in Philadelphia may rank among the earliest in the country.  Constructed in 1854, it was explicitly labeled "For the public good", it had respectable neo-classical detailing, and it was privately funded, all of which would set a pattern. It was described in 1884 as:

The first fountain, so called, stands upon the side of the road on the west side of the Wissahickon … It is claimed that this is the first drinking fountain erected in the county of Philadelphia outside of the Fairmount Water-Works. A clear, cold, mountain spring is carried by a spout, covered with a lion's head, from a niche in a granite front, with pilasters and pediment into a marble basin. The construction bears the date 1854 … Upon a slab above the niche are cut the words "Pro bono publico"; beneath the basin these, "Esto perpetua".

In the late 1860s, a mix of progressive organizations and private philanthropists began funding purpose-built, public water fountains. Early examples include the first fountain funded by the new American Society for the Prevention of Cruelty to Animals in 1867, in Union Square in New York City, and the work of the Philadelphia Fountain Society beginning in April 1869, whose fountains served people, horses, and dogs. Those Philadelphia fountains immediately proved their "utility and absolute necessity;" by September 1869 the Fountain Society had constructed 12, and the newly-founded Pennsylvania branch of the ASPCA had built another five. As of 1880, the Philadelphia Fountain Society alone maintained 50 fountains serving approximately 3 million people and 1 million horses and other animals.

The ASPCA had been founded in 1866 in New York, and spread quickly to active branches in Philadelphia and other cities.  One of its concerns was the difficulty of finding fresh water for work horses in urban areas. Combination drinking fountains that provided a bubbler for people and a water trough for horses, and sometimes a lower basin for dogs, became popular. In particular, over 120 National Humane Alliance fountains were donated to communities across the United States between 1903 and 1913. The fountains were the gift of philanthropist Hermon Lee Ensign.

Also working in parallel were various organizations of the Temperance Movement, who advocated abstinence from alcohol, and saw providing free fresh water as an attractive alternative. furthering its cause.  The Woman's Christian Temperance Union, founded in 1874, sponsored temperance fountains in towns and cities across the United States.  The Sons of Temperance built an elaborate and popular drinking fountain for Philadelphia's 1876 Centennial Exposition, later moved close to Independence Hall, that dispensed ice water.  
Henry D. Cogswell, a dentist and temperance crusader who made a fortune in San Francisco real estate, sponsored (and designed) dozens of artistic fountains, some of which were adorned with a statue of himself.

One myth claims that drinking fountains were first built in the United States in 1888 by the then-small Kohler Water Works (now Kohler Company) in Kohler, Wisconsin. However, no company by that name existed at the time.

Privately sponsored drinking fountains were often commissioned as works of art. Sculptors such as Karl Bitter, Alexander Stirling Calder, Gutzon Borglum and Daniel Chester French; and architects such as Paul Philippe Cret, Frederick Law Olmsted and Henry Hobson Richardson collaborated on them. These were frequently created as memorials to individuals, serving an ongoing utilitarian purpose as well as an artistic one.

In the United States, segregation of public facilities including but not limited to water fountains due to race, color, religion, or national origin was abolished by the Civil Rights Act of 1964. Prior to this, racially segregated water fountains with those for black people in worse condition than those for white people were common.

List of drinking fountains (organized by state)

''NOTE:  some entries in this table overlap the entries in Drinking fountains in Philadelphia.  Neither table is an exhaustive list.

See also 

 Drinking fountains in Philadelphia
 History of fountains in the United States

References

.

 
Plumbing
Temperance movement